IBMA may refer to:

 International Biocontrol Manufacturers' Association, an international manufacturers society of biological plant protection products 
 International Bluegrass Music Association, a trade association to promote bluegrass music
 International Bluegrass Music Awards, held yearly since 1990